Epipsestis peregovitsi is a moth in the family Drepanidae. It was described by Gyula M. László and Gábor Ronkay in 2000. It is found in Vietnam, Guangdong in China, Nepal and Thailand.

References

Thyatirinae
Moths described in 2000